Gotham Greens is an American fresh food and urban agricultural company founded and headquartered in the Brooklyn borough of New York City that grows local produce year-round in greenhouses, with its lettuces, herbs, salad dressings and sauces sold under its brand name. The company owns and operates nine hydroponic greenhouse facilities in the United States.

CEO of the company is Viraj Puri.

History 
Gotham Greens was founded by Viraj Puri and Eric Haley in 2009, aiming to bring fresh, local and pesticide-free vegetables, grown using ecologically sustainable methods, to urban areas. Puri has a sustainable development and environmental engineering background, and Haley has a banking and finance background and focuses on the business side of the venture. The company is headed by Puri, Haley and Jenn Frymark, who joined in 2009 to lead greenhouse operations.

After three years of planning, in May 2011 Gotham Greens opened its first location, a 15,000 square-foot greenhouse in Greenpoint, Brooklyn, that was reported to be the first commercial urban rooftop greenhouse in the United States. However, commercial greenhouses on rooftops have existed in New York City since at least since 1969, when Terrestris rooftop nursery opened on 60th Street in Manhattan.

The company opened its second location in 2013, a 20,000 square-foot greenhouse, atop a Whole Foods Market in Gowanus, Brooklyn; its third in 2015, a 75,000 square foot greenhouse in Chicago, Illinois, the largest rooftop greenhouse in the world; and its fourth location, a 60,000 square-foot greenhouse on the rooftop of the former Ideal Toy Company factory in Jamaica, Queens, in late 2015. At the end of 2019, Gotham Greens opened 100,000 square-foot greenhouse facilities in Chicago, Edgemere, Maryland, and Providence, Rhode Island. In 2020, the company opened a 30,000 square-foot greenhouse in Aurora, Colorado.

In 2020 Gotham Greens raised $87 million series D funding round led by Colorado VC Manna Tree with participation from Florida real estate and private equity investor The Silverman Group. Company raised money in new equity and debt capital, bringing the fast-growing company's total financing to $130 million.

In 2021 University of California Agriculture and Natural Resources (UC ANR) and the UC Davis College of Agricultural and Environmental Sciences (UCD CAES) have entered into a partnership with Gotham Greens to advance research and innovation in the areas of indoor agriculture, advanced greenhouse technology and urban agriculture.

Product 
Produce is packaged and sold in local stores under the Gotham Greens brand name, and also sold to local restaurants. In addition to its greens, the company also sells salad dressings and sauces. By controlling the environment, Gotham Greens can grow up to 30 times more low-calorie crops per acre than field agriculture. Their greenhouses use renewable electricity, fossil fuels for year-round heating, and require less water than a field operation using irrigation would.

Greenhouse locations 

 New York City – three facilities (Greenpoint, Brooklyn; Gowanus, Brooklyn; Jamaica, Queens)
 Chicago, Illinois – two facilities (Pullman)
 Edgemere, Maryland
 Providence, Rhode Island
 Aurora, Colorado
 Davis, California

See also 

 Controlled-environment agriculture
 Urban agriculture
 Roof garden
 Building-integrated agriculture
 Hydroponics

References

External links 

 Official Website

Agriculture in the United States
Agriculture companies of the United States
Companies based in Brooklyn
Greenhouses in New York (state)
Greenhouses in Illinois
Greenhouses in the United States
2009 establishments in New York City
Hydroponics
Urban agriculture
2009 establishments in the United States
Agriculture companies established in 2009
Food and drink companies based in New York City
American companies established in 2009
Farms in New York City